Sokratis Naoumis (born August 4, 1997) is a Greek professional basketball player for Eleftheroupoli Kavalas of the Greek 2nd Division. Standing at 1.91 m (6'3") tall, he plays at the point guard position.

Youth career
Naoumis played from a young age with the youth teams of A.O. Agriniou, before he started his pro career.

Professional career
Naoumis started his professional career with the Greek 1st Division club Apollon Patras, in 2016. He was loaned to Arkadikos of the Greek A2 League (2nd Division), the same year, in order to gain more playing time. On July 1, 2018, he joined the Greek club Kavala.

References

External links
RealGM.com Profile
Eurobasket.com Profile

1997 births
Living people
A.E.L. 1964 B.C. players
Arkadikos B.C. players
Charilaos Trikoupis B.C. players
Greek men's basketball players
Greek Basket League players
Kavala B.C. players
Sportspeople from Agrinio
Point guards